The Croatian question refers to a political, cultural, social and economical status of Croats in Austria-Hungary, Kingdom of Yugoslavia, SFR Yugoslavia and post-Dayton Bosnia and Herzegovina.

The first steps towards Croat home rule were made in 1939 with the Cvetković–Maček Agreement, creating the autonomous Banovina of Croatia. This province, mostly coterminous with the former Sava and Littoral Banovinas with the exception of a few other Croat-majority regions, lasted until invasion of Yugoslavia during the World War II, with the Independent State of Croatia being established as a Nazi German puppet state 10 April 1941.

In post-WWII Yugoslavia, the Croatian national question was mostly resolved on 25 June 1991 with the independence of the Republic of Croatia, from the territory of the constituent SR Croatia.

Sources 

 

National questions
Modern history of Croatia
Croats of Bosnia and Herzegovina
Yugoslav Croatia
Political terminology of Croatia